Mark Frutkin (born January 2, 1948) is a Canadian novelist and poet.  He has published ten books of fiction, three books of poetry, as well as two works of non-fiction and a book of essays. In 2022, his novel The Artist and the Assassin won the Silver Medal in the IPPY Awards (for books from independent publishers in Canada/US/Australia), in the category of literary fiction. In 2007, his novel, Fabrizio's Return, won the Trillium Prize for Best Book in Ontario and the Sunburst Award for Canadian Literature of the Fantastic, and was nominated for the Commonwealth Writers' Prize for Best Book (Canada/Caribbean region). In 1988, his novel, Atmospheres Apollinaire, was short-listed for a Governor General's Award and was also short-listed for the Trillium Award, as well as the Ottawa-Carleton Book Award. His works have been shortlisted for the Ottawa Book Awards five times. 

Frutkin went to Canada in 1970 as a draft resister during the Vietnam War after obtaining a Bachelor of Arts from Loyola University in Chicago, USA. In 1967-68 he studied at Loyola University in Rome, Italy. From 1970-80, he lived in a log cabin with no electricity or running water near Wolf Lake, Quebec. Since 1980, he has lived in Ottawa, Ontario, Canada with his wife, Faith.

As a journalist and critic he has written articles and reviews for The Globe and Mail, Harper's, the Ottawa Citizen, Montreal Gazette, Amazon.com/ca, Ottawa Magazine and other publications. His poetry and fiction have been published in numerous Canadian and foreign journals including Canadian Fiction Magazine, Descant, and Prism International.

Works
"The Walled Garden" (essays) - 2023 TBD (Upcoming)
"The Artist and the Assassin" (non-fiction) - 2021
"The Rising Tide" (non-fiction) - 2018
"Hermit Thrush" (poetry) - 2016
 A Message for the Emperor (fiction) - 2012
 Colourless Green Ideas Sleep Furiously (essays) - 2012
 Walking Backwards (non-fiction) - 2011
 Erratic North (non-fiction) - 2008
 Fabrizio's Return (novel) – 2006 Winner of the 2006 Trillium Award for Best Book in Ontario; Winner of Sunburst Award; Finalist for Commonwealth Award (Canada/Caribbean region) 
 Slow Lightning (novel) - 2001
 The Lion Of Venice (novel) -1997
 In The Time Of The Angry Queen (novel) -1993
 Invading Tibet (novel) -1991
 Atmospheres Apollinaire (novel) –1988, re-issued - 1998 (Finalist for Governor General's Award for Fiction in 1988; finalist for Trillium Award; finalist for Ottawa-Carleton Book Award)
 The Growing Dawn (novel) -1983
 Iron Mountain (poetry) - 2001
 Acts Of Light (poetry) -1992
 The Alchemy Of Clouds (poetry) - 1985

References

External links
Official site

1948 births
Canadian male novelists
20th-century Canadian poets
Canadian male poets
20th-century Canadian novelists
21st-century Canadian novelists
American expatriate writers in Canada
Vietnam War draft evaders
Living people
Writers from Ottawa
20th-century Canadian male writers
21st-century Canadian male writers